Robert Bostock, DD (10 July 1607, Buckinghamshire - 26 November 1640Lincolnshire) was Archdeacon of Suffolk from  January 1640 until his death

Bostock was educated at Merton College, Oxford. He held livings at Alcester, Romsey, Exton, and Mottisfont.

References

1607 births
1640 deaths
Alumni of Merton College, Oxford
Archdeacons of Suffolk